Rineloricaria tropeira is a species of catfish in the family Loricariidae. It is native to South America, where it occurs in tributaries of the Canoas River and the Pelotas River in the upper Uruguay River basin in Brazil. The species reaches 10.3 cm (4.1 inches) in standard length and is believed to be a facultative air-breather.

References 

Loricariidae
Fish described in 2008
Catfish of South America
Freshwater fish of Brazil